The 2008 Thailand League Division 2 Group B had 11 teams.

The league winners and runners up were promoted to Thailand Division 1 League. No teams would be relegated due to restructuring at the end of the season.

Member clubs& locations
Airforce Training College FC (Relegation from Thailand Division 1 League 2007 9th Group A)
Army Welfare Department F.C.
Bangkok Bravo FC  (Relegation from Thailand Division 1 League 2007 11th Group A)
Bangkok Christian College FC
Bangkok North Central ASSN FC  (Relegation from Thailand Division 1 League 2007 8th Group B)
Kasem Bundit University FC 
Lopburi FC  (promoted from Provincial League 2007 Winner)
Marine College FC (Relegation from Thailand Division 1 League 2007 12th Group B)
Navy Fleet Support FC
Si Saket FC (Relegation from Thailand Division 1 League 2007 10th Group B)
Thonburi College FC

Stadium and locations

Final league table

Results

See also 
 2008 Thailand Premier League
 2008 Thailand League Division 1
 2008 Thailand League Division 2
 2008 Thailand League Division 2 (Group A)
Thailand 2008 RSSSF

References

External links
 Football Association of Thailand

Thai League T4 seasons
3